Plomeur is a commune in the Bigouden region of Finistère department of Brittany in north-western France.

Plomeur is situated between the larger communes of Penmarc'h to the South-West, Guilvinec and Treffiagat to the South, as well as Pont-l'Abbé to the East.

The beaches on the Baie d'Audierne are shared with the community of Tréguennec to the north and Pors-Carn (part of the commune of Penmarc'h) to the south.

The beach is divided by the Pointe de la Torche, a promontory and rocky granite outcropping as well as a prehistoric settlement and burial site registered as a historic monument.

Population
Inhabitants of Plomeur are called in French Plomeurois.

Breton language
The municipality launched a linguistic plan concerning the Breton language through Ya d'ar brezhoneg on 28 April 2006.

In 2009, 30.71% of primary-school children attended bilingual schools.

See also
Communes of the Finistère department

References

External links
Official website 

Staying in Plomeur

Communes of Finistère